Sepo may refer to:

Sepo County, a county in North Korea
Sepo Chongnyon Station
Sepo, Illinois, a town in the United States
Sepo (band)
Sepo ceramics, Mississippian culture
SEPO (State Enterprise Policy Office), Ministry of Finance Thailand

See also
Seppo